The Taylor Prize in Mathematics is a cash prize awarded annually to an outstanding graduate student of mathematics, displaying excellence in graduate research and overall accomplishments, at The George Washington University in Washington, DC.  The prize is named after James Henry Taylor, a professor of mathematics at GW from 1929 to 1958.

History
James Henry Taylor was a mathematics professor at GW from 1929 to 1958 and then professor emeritus until his death in 1972.  Several years after his death the president of the university, Lloyd H. Elliott, along with several of the professors in the Mathematics Department, including Taylor's good friend Fritz Joachim Weyl, decided to create an award in his memory.  Money was deposited in an account from which the prize funds would be drawn annually.  The interest that builds throughout the year on the account makes up the majority of the annual prize.  For example, in 1983 first year graduate student Karma Dajani won the prize, which at the time was $500 but when she won the prize again in 1986 it was worth only $300 because interest had not accumulated for as many years.  Thomas J. Carter became the first recipient of the prize in 1977.

About the recipients
The GWU bulletin simply describes the criteria for recipients of the prize as, "awarded to an outstanding mathematics graduate student."  Many of the thirty-four winners of the Taylor Prize have gone on to become professors of mathematics at various universities.  Most have published essays and books or given lectures on their specific subjects.

Complete list of recipients

See also

 List of mathematics awards

References

Mathematics awards
George Washington University
1977 establishments in Washington, D.C.
Awards established in 1977